Dominique Kremer (born June 9, 1997) is an American ice hockey defender, currently playing with the Buffalo Beauts of the Premier Hockey Federation (PHF).

Playing career  
Kremer began skating at the age of three, playing hockey for the first time two years later. She later played with the St. Louis Lady Blues organisation, before attending Shattuck-St. Mary's in Minnesota for high school.

From 2015 to 2019, she attended Merrimack College, scoring 56 points in 138 NCAA Division I games with the Merrimack Warriors women's ice hockey team of the Hockey East conference. She scored her first collegiate career goal as a rookie on the October 3, 2015 against St. Cloud State. During the 2018–19 season, Kremer served as an alternate captain for Merrimack and was named to the All-WHEA Third Team.

She was drafted 17th overall by the Connecticut Whale in the 2018 NWHL Draft. Instead of joining the PHF after graduating, she signed her first professional contract with Djurgårdens IF of the Swedish Women's Hockey League (SDHL), stating that she felt the SDHL was the league that offered the highest skill level. She scored 16 points in 36 games in her rookie SDHL season, the highest scoring defender on her team.

After originally planning to continue playing in Sweden, restrictions caused by the COVID-19 pandemic prompted her to return to North America to sign in the PHF, joining the Buffalo Beauts for the 2020–21 NWHL season. She was the first player signed by newly named Beauts general manager Nate Oliver.

Personal life   
At Merrimack College, she majored in international studies and French, with a minor in pre-law.

Career statistics

References

External links

1997 births
Living people
American women's ice hockey defensemen
Ice hockey people from Iowa
People from Black Hawk County, Iowa
Buffalo Beauts players
Djurgårdens IF Hockey players
Merrimack Warriors women's ice hockey players
American expatriate ice hockey players in Sweden